David Clive Jenkins (2 May 1926 – 22 September 1999) was a British trade union leader. "Organising the middle classes", his stated recreation in Who's Who, sums up both his sense of humour and his achievements in the British trade union movement.

Early life
He was born in Port Talbot, Glamorgan, Wales. His father was a railway worker, and his brother, Tom, became leader of the Transport Salaried Staffs' Association. On leaving Port Talbot County School in 1940 at the age of 14, when his father died, he started work in the laboratory at a metalworks and continued his education by taking evening classes at Swansea Technical College. Three years later, he was in charge of the lab. Two years after that, he was a night shift foreman.

Union career
Jenkins had early involvement in his trade union, the Association of Scientific Workers (AScW), and become a lay official in 1944, when he was elected as secretary of his branch. In 1946, at the age of 20, he left Port Talbot to become a full-time official at the Birmingham office of the Association of Supervisory Staff, Executives and Technicians (ASSET), where he was appointed assistant divisional secretary. He was at that time a member of the Communist Party of Great Britain.

In 1951, he organised his first major national dispute, a strike at Heathrow Airport that caused British European Airways to cancel more than 800 flights.

Moving almost immediately to the head office, he received rapid promotion: as national officer in 1954, deputy general secretary in 1957, and general secretary in 1961.

Then, ASSET had 23,000 members, which later increased to 50,000 by 1969, when ASSET merged with AScW, to form ASTMS (the Association of Scientific, Technical and Managerial Staffs). ASSET and Jenkins were the senior partner. In the new union, he was joint general secretary (with John Dutton) of AScW, but by 1970, he was sole general secretary with a vision of what "his" union could become.

By the use of advertising (billboard posters were previously unheard of in the movement), he brought trades unionism to the middle classes. Within 15 years, ASTMS grew from an initial membership of 65,000 to a figure approaching 500,000.

Jenkins kept himself (and ASTMS) in the public eye, with frequent appearances on television chat shows and his own regular newspaper columns. His wit and turn of phrase ensured that even his opponents would certainly remember him.

However, his brash character ensured that more staid trade union leaders kept him off the General Council of the TUC. until 1974. He even became its chairman, from 1987 to 1988.

Involvement in politics
A Labour government, under Harold Wilson, was elected in 1974. Jenkins was then appointed to the National Research and Development Council (NRDC), from 1974 to 1980. He sat on the committee that produced the Bullock Report (Industrial democracy) (1975–1977) as well as on the board of the British National Oil Corporation (1979–1982).

During the 1975 referendum on Britain's membership of the EEC, Jenkins campaigned for Britain to leave the EEC.

Following the Labour Party's heavy defeat in the 1983 election, Jenkins was instrumental in getting Neil Kinnock nominated to the leadership of the party. In 1988, shortly after ASTMS merged with TASS (the Technical, Administrative and Supervisory Section) to form MSF (Manufacturing, Science and Finance), Jenkins unexpectedly announced his retirement. He wrote an autobiography, All Against The Collar (1990).

Retirement
Upon retiring, Jenkins ran a bed and breakfast in St Helens, Tasmania, before he returned to Britain.

Bibliography
British Airlines: a study of nationalised civil aviation (1953). Fabian Research Series, no 158. London: Victor Gollancz.
Power at the Top: a critical survey of the nationalised industries (1959). London: MacGibbon & Kee.
Germany’s Balance of Influence: the changing situation in NATO (1960). London: Union of Democratic Control.
Power behind the Screen: ownership control and motivation in British commercial television (1961). London: MacGibbon & Kee.
British Trade Unions today (1965). Oxford: Pergamon Press (with James Edward Mortimer)
Collective bargaining: what you always wanted to know about trade unions and never dared to ask (1977). London: Routledge and Kegan Paul. . (with Barrie Sherman).
Computers and the unions (1977). London: Longman.  (with Barrie Sherman).
White-collar unionism: the rebellious salariat (1979). London: Routledge and Kegan Paul.  (with Barrie Sherman).
The collapse of work (1979). London : Eyre Methuen.  (with Barrie Sherman).
The leisure shock (1981). London : Eyre Methuen.  (with Barrie Sherman).
All against the collar: struggles of a white collar union leader (1990). London: Methuen.

References

Sources

External links
Catalogue of Jenkins' papers, held at the Modern Records Centre, University of Warwick

1926 births
1999 deaths
General Secretaries of MSF
People from Port Talbot
Members of the General Council of the Trades Union Congress
Presidents of the Trades Union Congress
People educated at Port Talbot County Boys' Grammar School